Loffe the Tramp (Swedish: Loffe på luffen) is a 1948 Swedish comedy film directed by Gösta Werner and starring Elof Ahrle, Wiktor Andersson and Agneta Prytz. It was shot at the Centrumateljéerna Studios in Stockholm and on location in the city. The film's sets were designed by the art director Bertil Duroj. It was followed by a sequel Loffe as a Millionaire later the same year with Ahrle reprising his role.

Cast
 Elof Ahrle as 	Loffe Fridh
 Wiktor Andersson as Trubbnos
 Erik Berglund as Dahlberg
 Agneta Prytz as 	Anna-Lisa
 Lasse Krantz as 	Andersson
 Yngve Nordwall as 	Heiman
 Theodor Berthels as 	Police Inspector
 Julia Cæsar as 	Hotel hostess
 Bengt Eklund as 	Police Officer
 Sture Ericson as 	Man at bicycle
 Gustav Hedberg as 	Police 
 Magnus Kesster as 	Sjökvist
 Mimi Nelson as 	Young woman at pharmacy store
 Gösta Prüzelius as 	Police Officer
 Hans Strååt as 	Public Prosecutor
 Lissi Alandh as 	Bridesmaid 
 Margaretha Bergström as 	Telephone Operator 
 Carl Ericson as 	Janitor
 Gunnel Wadner as 	Telephone Operator 
 Chris Wahlström as 	Waitress

References

Bibliography 
  Cowie, Peter Françoise Buquet, Risto Pitkänen & Godfried Talboom. Scandinavian Cinema: A Survey of the Films and Film-makers of Denmark, Finland, Iceland, Norway, and Sweden. Tantivy Press, 1992.

External links 
 

1948 films
Swedish comedy films
1948 comedy films
1940s Swedish-language films
Films directed by Gösta Werner
Films shot in Stockholm
1940s Swedish films